The third and final season of the American science fiction television series Defiance premiered on Syfy on June 12, 2015, concluded on August 28, 2015, and consisted a total of 13 episodes. The show stars Grant Bowler, Julie Benz, Stephanie Leonidas, Tony Curran, Jaime Murray, Graham Greene, Jesse Rath, Anna Hopkins and Nichole Galicia.

The series is produced by Universal Cable Productions, in transmedia collaboration with Trion Worlds, who have released an MMORPG video game of the same name which is tied into the series.

Cast

Main 
 Grant Bowler as Joshua Nolan
 Julie Benz as Amanda Rosewater
 Stephanie Leonidas as Irisa Nyira
 Tony Curran as Datak Tarr
 Jaime Murray as Stahma Tarr
 Graham Greene as Rafe McCawley
 Jesse Rath as Alak Tarr
 Anna Hopkins as Jessica "Berlin" Rainer
 Nichole Galicia as Kindzi

Notes

Special guest
James Murray as Niles Pottinger

Recurring 
 Trenna Keating as Doc Yewll
 Dewshane Williams as Tommy LaSalle
 Justin Rain as Quentin McCawley
 Nicole Muñoz as Christie McCawley Tarr
 Linda Hamilton as Pilar McCawley
 Douglas Nyback as Sgt. Frei Poole
 Lee Tergesen as General Rahm Tak
 Conrad Coates as T'evgin
 Billy MacLellan as Lieutenant Bebe
 Tony Nappo as Indur
 Rainbow Sun Francks as Uno
 Demore Barnes as Dos

Guest 
Ian Ziering as Conrad Von Bach
Wendy Crewson as Silora Voske

Episodes

Production
On September 25, 2014, Defiance was renewed for a 13-episode third season with the two-hour season premiere on June 12, 2015. Production commenced in Toronto in February 2015. Lee Tergesen, Conrad Coates, Nichole Galicia joined the cast in recurring roles for season 3 while Anna Hopkins was promoted to series regular.

Ratings

References

External links 

2015 American television seasons
Defiance (TV series)